The Dardanelles Army was formed in late 1915 and comprised the three army corps of the British Army operating at Gallipoli.  It was created as a result of the reorganisation of headquarters when the second Mediterranean front opened at Salonika.  Prior to this, all British (and Dominion) units in the Mediterranean came under GHQ of the Mediterranean Expeditionary Force.  The Dardanelles Army was created to manage operations at Gallipoli while the Salonika Army managed operations at Salonika.  Both armies came under the direction of the MEF, which was also responsible for the defence of Egypt.

The Dardanelles Army was short-lived as, by the time of its creation, offensive operations at Gallipoli had ceased and plans for the evacuation were being made.  For most of its existence, the Army was commanded by Lieutenant General William Birdwood.  It comprised the British VIII Corps and IX Corps as well as the Australian and New Zealand Army Corps and the 1st Newfoundland Regiment.

Dardanelles
Dardanelles
Military units and formations of the British Army in World War I
Military units and formations established in 1915
Gallipoli campaign